Zuibaichi is a Chinese garden in Shanghai's suburban Songjiang District that dates back to the Song Dynasty.  It occupies an area of 5 hectares and is one of the five ancient Chinese gardens in Shanghai, along the Guyi Garden, the Yu Garden, the Garden of Autumn Vapors, and the Garden of Zigzag Stream.

History
The garden was first set up as the private villa of Zhu Zhichun, a Jinshi selected from Imperial examination. Its size was rarely enlarged for hundreds of years until Dong Qichang, a Chinese painter, calligrapher of the later period of the Ming Dynasty, built several more ancient architectural complex on its original basis. In 1797, the garden began to be used as a foundling hospital until it was well repaired and reopened to the public in 1959.

The garden's name lies in the famous Chinese poet Li Bai. It is said that if Li Bai was brought back to life and had a sightseeing here, he would certainly lingered on and forgot to return, just about drunk. Actually famous men of letters usually gathered together, making various poems on the fantastic landscape.

Scenery
Drunken Bai Garden has an architectural style of Chinese traditional garden which was inherited from architectures in Suzhou: elegant pavilions, winding and zigzagging paves, carved beams and painted rafters. It was such a scenery of exceptional charm that it attracts an endless stream of tourists.

Meanwhile, luxuriant plants can be seen in a blaze of colors here, especially lotus flowers that are in bloom in summer. To the north of the pond stands an ancient cinnamon tree which is over 300 years old.

Features
Ancient Long Gallery
Crane Pavilion
Stone Sculpture
Xuehai Hall
Sun Yat-sen allegedly held a speech in Xuehai Hall on December 27, 1912, during an inspection visit he undertook to Songjiang together with Chen Qimei and Dai Jitao . In this speech Sun addressed the further development of the newly founded Republic of China, the problems left over by the Xinhai Revolution, and the education system. After finishing the address, Sun took a group photo with members of the Tongmenghui inside of the hall.

See also
Chinese Garden
List of Chinese gardens

References

Gardens in Shanghai